Sambou Soumano (born 13 January 2001) is a Senegalese professional footballer who plays as a forward for French  club Rodez on loan from Lorient.

Career
A product of the Senegalese academy Youth Elite Foot, Soumano began his senior career with the French club Pau, and followed that with a stint at Châteaubriant. On 19 August 2021, he transferred to the reserve side of FC Lorient. He made his professional debut as a late substitute with Lorient in a 1–1 Ligue 1 tie over Bordeaux on 24 October 2021

On 20 August 2022, Soumano joined Eupen in Belgium on a season-long loan. On 18 January 2023, he moved on a new loan to Rodez in Ligue 2.

References

External links
 

2001 births
Living people
Footballers from Dakar
Senegalese footballers
Association football forwards
Pau FC players
FC Lorient players
K.A.S. Eupen players
Rodez AF players
Ligue 1 players
Championnat National players
Championnat National 2 players
Championnat National 3 players
Belgian Pro League players
Ligue 2 players
Senegalese expatriate footballers
Senegalese expatriate sportspeople in France
Expatriate footballers in France
Senegalese expatriate sportspeople in Belgium
Expatriate footballers in Belgium